Vasant Deo (1929-1996) was an Indian writer, lyricist and screenwriter and a Hindi academic at Parle College in Mumbai. He worked in Hindi parallel cinema through the 1980s, working with directors like Shyam Benegal, Govind Nihalani and Mahesh Bhatt. He is best known for "Saanjh Dhale Gagan Tale" sung by Suresh Wadkar, and  "Mann Kyun Behka", a Lata Mangeshkar and Asha Bhosle duet in Utsav (1984) directed by Girish Karnad. He wrote plays and poetry in Marathi, and Marathi to Hindi translator.

At the 32nd National Film Awards, he won the National Film Award for Best Lyrics for Saaransh (1984). Subsequently, at the 33rd Filmfare Awards, he won the Filmfare Award for Best Lyricist for song, "Mann Kyun Behka" in Utsav. In 1980s, for the television serial Bharat Ek Khoj (Discovery of India), director Shyam Benegal asked Vasant Deo to translate Sanskrit hymns from Rigveda in Hindi. They were set to music by Vanraj Bhatia.

Filmography

Dialogue

 Umbartha (1982) 
 Ardh Satya (1983) 
 Party (1984, assistant dialogue) 
  Kamla (1984)
 Nasoor (1985)
 Sur Sangham (1985)
 Andha Yudh  (1987)
 Bharat Ek Khoj (TV series) (1988)

Lyricist
 Bhumika (1977)
 Aakrosh (1980)
 Saaransh (1984)
 Giddh (1984) 
 Utsav (1984)
 Sur Sangham (1985)
 Ramayana: The Legend of Prince Rama (1992) Sanskrit songs

References

External links
 

1929 births
1996 deaths
Indian male screenwriters
Hindi-language writers
20th-century Indian poets
Screenwriters from Mumbai
Academic staff of the University of Mumbai
Indian lyricists
Marathi-language writers
20th-century Indian translators
Translators to Hindi
Filmfare Awards winners
20th-century Indian male writers
Best Lyrics National Film Award winners
20th-century Indian screenwriters